Ancistrus jelskii is a species of catfish in the family Loricariidae. It is native to the upper Tulumayo River basin, which is part of the Ucayali River system in Peru. The species reaches 8 cm (3.1 inches) in total length.

References 

jelskii
Fish described in 1877